Likud, officially known as Likud – National Liberal Movement, is a major centre-right to right-wing political party in Israel. It was founded in 1973 by Menachem Begin and Ariel Sharon in an alliance with several right-wing parties. Likud's landslide victory in the 1977 elections was a major turning point in the country's political history, marking the first time the left had lost power. In addition, it was the first time in Israel that a right-wing party won the plurality of the votes. After ruling the country for most of the 1980s, the party lost the Knesset election in 1992. Likud's candidate Benjamin Netanyahu won the vote for Prime Minister in 1996 and was given the task of forming a government after the 1996 elections. Netanyahu's government fell apart after a vote of no confidence, which led to elections being called in 1999 and Likud losing power to the One Israel coalition led by Ehud Barak.

In 2001, Likud's Ariel Sharon, who replaced Netanyahu following the 1999 election, defeated Barak in an election called by the Prime Minister following his resignation. After the party recorded a convincing win in the 2003 elections, Likud saw a major split in 2005 when Sharon left to form the Kadima party. This resulted in Likud slumping to fourth place in the 2006 elections and losing 28 seats in the Knesset. Following the 2009 elections, Likud was able to gain 15 seats, and, with Netanyahu back in control of the party, formed a coalition with fellow right-wing parties Yisrael Beiteinu and Shas to take control of the government from Kadima, which earned a plurality, but not a majority. Netanyahu served as prime minister from then until 2021. Likud had been the leading vote-getter in each subsequent election until April 2019, when Likud tied with Blue and White and September 2019, when Blue and White won one more seat than the Likud. Likud won the most seats at the 2020 and 2021 elections, but Netanyahu was removed from power in June 2021 by an unprecedented coalition led by Yair Lapid and Naftali Bennett. He subsequently returned to the office of Prime Minister after winning the 2022 election.

A member of the party is called a Likudnik.

History

Formation and Begin years
The Likud was formed on 13 September 1973 as a secular party by an alliance of several right-wing parties prior to that year's legislative election—Herut, the Liberal Party, the Free Centre, the National List, and the Movement for Greater Israel. Herut had been the nation's largest right-wing party since growing out of the Irgun in 1948. It had already been in coalition with the Liberals since 1965 as Gahal, with Herut as the senior partner. Herut remained the senior partner in the new grouping, which was given the name Likud, meaning "Consolidation", as it represented the consolidation of the Israeli right. It worked as a coalition under Herut's leadership until 1988, when the member parties merged into a single party under the Likud name. From its establishment in 1973, Likud enjoyed great support from blue-collar Sephardim.

In its first election, the Likud won 39 seats, reducing the Alignment's lead to 12. The party went on to win the 1977 election with 43 seats, finishing 11 seats ahead of the Alignment. Begin was able to form a government with the support of the religious parties, consigning the left-wing to opposition for the first time since independence. A former leader of the hard-line paramilitary Irgun, Begin signed the 1978 Camp David Accords and the 1979 Egypt–Israel peace treaty. In the 1981 election, the Likud won 48 seats, but formed a narrower government than in 1977.

Likud has long been a loose alliance between politicians committed to different and sometimes opposing policy preferences and ideologies. The 1981 election highlighted divisions that existed between the populist wing of Likud, headed by David Levy of Herut, and the Liberal wing, who represented a policy agenda of the secular bourgeoisie.

Shamir and Netanyahu's first term
On 28 August 1983, Begin announced his intention to resign as Prime Minister. He was replaced by Yitzhak Shamir, a former commander of the Lehi underground, who defeated Deputy Prime Minister David Levy in a leadership election held by Herut's central committee. Shamir was seen as a hard-liner, who opposed the Camp David accords and Israel's withdrawal from Southern Lebanon. The party won 41 seats in the 1984 election, less than the Alignment's 44. The Alignment was unable to form a government on its own, leading to the formation of a rotation government, led jointly by the Alignment and Likud. Shimon Peres became the Prime Minister, with Shamir becoming the Foreign Minister. In October of 1986, the two switched posts. The Likud won the 1988 election, defeating the Alignment by a one-seat Margin. The two parties formed another government, in which Shamir served as Prime Minister without a rotation. In 1990, Peres withdrew from the government and led a successful vote of no-confidence against it, in what became known as the dirty trick. Shamir formed a new government with right-wing parties, which served until the 1992 election, in which the Likud was defeated by Yitzhak Rabin's Labor Party.

Shamir stepped down as Likud leader after losing the election in March of 1993. To replace him, the party held its first primary election, in which former United Nations Ambassador Benjamin Netanyahu defeated David Levy, Benny Begin and Moshe Katsav, becoming the Leader of the Opposition. In 1995, Following the assassination of Yitzhak Rabin, Shimon Peres, his temporary successor, decided to call early elections in order to give the government a mandate to advance the peace process. The election was held in May of 1996, and included a direct vote for the Prime Minister in which Netanyahu narrowly defeated Peres, becoming the new Prime Minister.
In 1998, Netanyahu agreed to cede territory in the Wye River Memorandum, which led some Likud MKs, led by Benny Begin (Menachem Begin's son), Michael Kleiner and David Re'em, to break away and form a new party, named Herut – The National Movement. The new party was endorsed by Yitzhak Shamir, who expressed disappointment in Netanyahu's Leadership. Following the withdrawal of his remaining partners, Netanyahu's coalition collapsed in December of 1998, resulting in the 1999 election, where Labor's Ehud Barak defeated Netanyahu on a platform promoting the settlement of final status issues. Following his defeat, Netanyahu stepped down as leader of Likud. That September, former Defense Minister Ariel Sharon won a leadership election to replace Netanyahu, defeating Jerusalem Mayor Ehud Olmert and former Finance Minister Meir Sheetrit.

Barak's government collapsed in December of 2000, several months after the Camp David Summit ended without an agreement, and early elections for Prime Minister were called for February of 2001, in which Sharon decisively defeated Barak. In 2002, Netanyahu challenged Sharon in a leadership election, but was defeated. During Sharon's tenure, Likud faced an internal split due to Sharon's policy of unilateral disengagement from Gaza and parts of the West Bank, which proved extremely divisive within the party.

Sharon and Kadima split
Sharon's Disengagement Plan alienated him from some Likud supporters and fragmented the party. He faced several serious challenges to his authority shortly before his departure. The first was in March 2005, when he and Netanyahu, then his Finance Minister, proposed a budget plan that met fierce opposition from the opposition and parties to the Likud's right. The plan passed the Knesset's finance committee by a one-vote margin, before being approved by the Knesset by a wider margin later that month. The second was in September 2005, when Sharon's critics in the Likud, led by Netanyahu, forced a vote in the Likud's central committee on a proposal for an early leadership election, which was defeated by 52% to 48%. In November, Sharon's opponents within the Likud joined with the opposition to prevent the appointment of three of his associates to the Cabinet, successfully preventing the appointment of two.

On 20 November, Labor announced its withdrawal from Sharon's governing coalition following the election of the left-wing Amir Peretz as its leader. On 21 November 2005, Sharon announced he would be leaving the Likud and forming a new centrist party, Kadima. The new party included both Likud and Labor supporters of unilateral disengagement. Sharon also announced that an election would take place in early 2006. Seven candidates had declared themselves as contenders to replace Sharon as leader: Netanyahu, Uzi Landau, Shaul Mofaz, Yisrael Katz, Silvan Shalom and Moshe Feiglin. Landau and Mofaz later withdrew, the former in favour of Netanyahu and the latter to join Kadima.

Netanyahu's second term
Netanyahu went on to win a leadership election to replace Sharon in December, obtaining 44.4% of the vote. Shalom came in a second with 33%, while far-right candidate Moshe Feiglin achieved 12.4% of the vote. Due to Shalom's performance, Netanyahu guaranteed him the second place on the party's list of Knesset candidates. Polls before the 2006 election showed a substantial reduction in the Likud's support, with Kadima achieving a dominant polling lead. 

In January 2006, Sharon suffered a stroke that left him in a vegetative state, leading to his replacement as Kadima leader by Ehud Olmert, who led Kadima to victory in the election, winning 29 seats. The Likud experienced a substantial loss in support, coming in fourth place and winning only 12, while other right-wing nationalist parties such as Yisrael Beiteinu, which came within 116 votes of overtaking Likud, gained votes. After the election, Netanyahu was re-elected Likud Leader in 2007, defeating Feiglin and World Likud Chairman Danny Danon.

Following the opening of several criminal investigations against Olmert, he resigned as Prime Minister on 21 September 2008 and retired from politics. In the ensuing snap election, held in 2009, Likud won 27 seats, the second-largest number of seats and one seat less than Kadima, now led by Tzipi Livni. However, Likud's allies won enough seats to allow Netanyahu to form a government, which included Likud, Yisrael Beiteinu, Shas, United Torah Judaism, The Jewish Home and Labor. Labor left the coalition in 2011 after party leader Ehud Barak left to form his own party, Independence, that remained a member of Netanyahu's government. The next year, Netanyahu was re-elected as Likud leader, defeating Moshe Feiglin. Kadima then joined the coalition in May of 2012 before leaving in July. Following Kadima's withdrawal from the government and amid disagreements related to the 2013 budget, the Knesset was dissolved in October 2012 and a snap election was called for January 2013.

Partnership with Yisrael Beitenu and 2015 election 
Several days after the election was called, on 25 October 2012, Netanyahu and Yisrael Beitenu leader Avigdor Lieberman announced that their respective political parties would run together on a single ballot in the election under the name Likud Yisrael Beiteinu. The move led to speculation that Lieberman would eventually seek the leadership of Likud after he stated that he 'Wanted to become the Prime Minister'. Several days before the election, Lieberman said the parties would not merge, and that their direct partnership would end after the election. The partnership ultimately lasted until July 2014, when it officially dissolved.

In the 2013 election, the Likud-Yisrael Beiteinu alliance won 31 seats, 20 of which were Likud members. The second largest party, Yair Lapid's Yesh Atid, won 19. Netanyahu continued as Prime Minister after forming a coalition with Yesh Atid, the Jewish Home and Hatnuah. The government collapsed in December 2014 due to disagreements over the budget and the proposed Nation-state bill, triggering a snap election the next year.

Likud won the 2015 election, defeating the Zionist Union, an alliance of Labor and Hatnuah, winning 30 seats to the Zionist Union's 24. The party subsequently formed a government with United Torah Judaism, Shas, Kulanu and the Jewish Home. In May of 2016, Yisrael Beitenu joined the government, before leaving in December of 2018, causing Netanyahu to call a snap election for April 2019.

2019–2022 elections 
During the course of the April 2019 Israeli legislative election campaign, Likud facilitated the formation of the Union of Right-Wing Parties between the Jewish Home, Tkuma and Otzma Yehudit by providing a slot on its own electoral list to Jewish Home candidate Eli Ben-Dahan. In the aftermath of the election, Kulanu merged into Likud.

During the September 2019 Israeli legislative election campaign, Likud agreed to a deal with Zehut, whereby the latter party would drop out of the election and endorse Likud in exchange for a ministerial post for its leader, Moshe Feiglin, as well as policy concessions.

Prior to the 2020 Israeli legislative election, Gideon Sa'ar unsuccessfully challenged Netanyahu for the Likud leadership. In December of that year, Sa'ar left Likud, along with four other Likud MKs, to form New Hope.

Prior to the 2021 Israeli legislative election, Gesher merged into Likud, receiving a slot on its electoral list. Likud also facilitated the formation of a joint list between the Religious Zionist Party, Otzma Yehudit and Noam by providing the Religious Zionist Party a slot on the Likud list. On 14 June, after the swearing-in of the 36th government, Ofir Sofer who held the slot, split from the Likud faction and returned to the Religious Zionist Party, decreasing the Likud faction by one to 29 seats in the Knesset.

Likud won the most seats in the 2022 Israeli legislative election

Ideological positions

Likud emphasizes national security policy based on a strong military force when threatened with continued enmity against Israel. It has shown reluctance to negotiate with its neighbors whom it believes continue to seek the destruction of the Jewish state, that based on the principle of the party founder Menachem Begin concerning the preventive policy to any potential attacks on State of Israel. Its suspicion of neighboring Arab nations' intentions, however, has not prevented the party from reaching agreements with the Arabs, such as the 1979 peace treaty with Egypt. Likud's willingness to enter mutually accepted agreements with the Arabs over the years is related to the formation of other right-wing parties. Like other right-wing parties in Israel, Likud politicians have sometimes criticized particular Supreme Court decisions, but it remains committed to rule of law principles that it hopes to entrench in a written constitution.

, the party remains divided between moderates and hard-liners.

Likud is considered to be the leading party in the national camp in Israeli politics.

Platform
 The 1999 Likud Party platform emphasizes the right of settlement.

"The Jewish communities in Judea, Samaria, and Gaza are the realization of Zionist values. Settlement of the land is a clear expression of the unassailable right of the Jewish people to the Land of Israel and constitutes an important asset in the defense of the vital interests of the State of Israel. The Likud will continue to strengthen and develop these communities and will prevent their uprooting."

Similarly, they claim the Jordan River as the permanent eastern border to Israel and it also claims Jerusalem as belonging to Israel.

 The 'Peace & Security' chapter of the 1999 Likud Party platform rejects a Palestinian state.

"The Government of Israel flatly rejects the establishment of a Palestinian Arab state west of the Jordan river. The Palestinians can run their lives freely in the framework of self-rule, but not as an independent and sovereign state. Thus, for example, in matters of foreign affairs, security, immigration, and ecology, their activity shall be limited in accordance with imperatives of Israel's existence, security and national needs."

With Likud back in power, starting in 2009, Israeli foreign policy is still under review. Likud leader Benjamin Netanyahu, in his "National Security" platform, neither endorsed nor ruled out the idea of a Palestinian state. "Netanyahu has hinted that he does not oppose the creation of a Palestinian state, but aides say he must move cautiously because his religious-nationalist coalition partners refuse to give away land."

On 14 June 2009, Netanyahu delivered a speech at Bar-Ilan University (also known as "Bar-Ilan Speech"), at Begin-Sadat Center for Strategic Studies, that was broadcast live in Israel and across parts of the Arab world, on the topic of the Middle East peace process. He endorsed for the first time the creation of a Palestinian state alongside Israel, with several conditions.

However, on 16 March 2015, Netanyahu stated in the affirmative, that if he were elected, a Palestinian state would not be created. Netanyahu argued, "anyone who goes to create today a Palestinian state and turns over land, is turning over land that will be used as a launching ground for attacks by Islamist extremists against the State of Israel." Some take these statements to mean that Netanyahu and Likud oppose a Palestinian state. After having been criticised by U.S. White House Spokesperson Josh Earnest for the "divisive rhetoric" of his election campaign, on 19 March 2015, Netanyahu retreated to "I don't want a one-state solution. I want a peaceful, sustainable two-state solution. I have not changed my policy."

The Likud Constitution of May 2014 is more vague and ambiguous. Though it contains commitments to the strengthening of Jewish settlement in the West Bank, it does not explicitly rule out the establishment of a Palestinian state.

Economy
The Likud party claims to support a free market capitalist and liberal agenda, though, in practice, it has mostly adopted mixed economic policies. Under the guidance of Finance minister and current party leader Benjamin Netanyahu, Likud pushed through legislation reducing value added tax (VAT), income and corporate taxes significantly, as well as customs duty. Likewise, it has instituted free trade (especially with the European Union and the United States) and dismantled certain monopolies (Bezeq and the seaports). Additionally, it has privatized numerous government-owned companies, e. g., El Al and Bank Leumi, and has moved to privatize land in Israel, which until now has been held symbolically by the state in the name of the Jewish people. Netanyahu was the most ardent free-market Israeli finance minister to date. He argued that Israel's largest labor union, the Histadrut, has so much power as to be capable of paralyzing the Israeli economy, and claimed that the main causes of unemployment are laziness and excessive benefits to the unemployed." Under Netanyahu, Likud has and is likely to maintain a comparatively fiscally conservative economic stance. However, the party's economic policies vary widely among members, with some Likud MKs supporting more leftist economic positions that are more in line with popular preferences.

Palestinians

Likud has historically espoused opposition to Palestinian statehood and support of Israeli settlements in the West Bank and Gaza Strip. However, it has also been the party that carried out the first peace agreements with Arab states. For instance, in 1979, Likud Prime Minister Menachem Begin signed the Camp David Accords with Egyptian President Anwar al-Sadat, which returned the Sinai Peninsula (occupied by Israel in the Six-Day War of 1967) to Egypt in return for peace between the two countries. Yitzhak Shamir was the first Israeli Prime Minister to meet Palestinian leaders at the Madrid Conference following the Persian Gulf War in 1991. However, Shamir refused to concede the idea of a Palestinian state, and as a result was blamed by some (including United States Secretary of State James Baker) for the failure of the summit. On 14 June 2009, as Prime Minister Netanyahu gave a speech at Bar-Ilan University in which he endorsed a "Demilitarized Palestinian State", though said that Jerusalem must remain the unified capital of Israel.

In 2002, during the Second Intifada, Israel's Likud-led government reoccupied Palestinian towns and refugee camps in the West Bank. In 2005, Ariel Sharon defied the recent tendencies of Likud and abandoned the policy of seeking to settle in the West Bank and Gaza. Though re-elected Prime Minister on a platform of no unilateral withdrawals, Sharon carried out the Gaza disengagement plan, withdrawing from the Gaza Strip, as well as four settlements in the northern West Bank. Though losing a referendum among Likud registered voters, Sharon achieved government approval of this policy by firing most of the cabinet members who opposed the plan before the vote.

Sharon and the faction who supported his disengagement proposals left the Likud party after the disengagement and created the new Kadima party. This new party supported unilateral disengagement from most of the West Bank and the fixing of borders by the Israeli West Bank barrier. The basic premise of the policy was that the Israelis have no viable negotiating partner on the Palestinian side, and since they cannot remain in indefinite occupation of the West Bank and Gaza, Israel should unilaterally withdraw.

Netanyahu, who was elected as the new leader of Likud after Kadima's creation, and Silvan Shalom, the runner-up, both supported the disengagement plan; however, Netanyahu resigned his ministerial post before the plan was executed. Most current Likud members support the Jewish settlements in the West Bank and oppose Palestinian statehood and the disengagement from Gaza.

Although settlement activity has continued under recent Likud governments, much of the activity outside the major settlement blocs has been to accommodate the Jewish Home, a coalition partner; support within Likud to build outside the blocs is not particularly strong.

In the 2019 election, Likud was widely criticized as a "racist party" after scaremongering anti-Arab rhetoric by its members as well as Netanyahu who claimed minority Arabs and Palestinians in Israel as "threats" and "enemies,".

Culture

Likud generally advocates free enterprise and nationalism, but it has sometimes compromised these ideals in practice, especially as its constituency has changed. Its support for populist economic programs are at odds with its free enterprise tradition, but are meant to serve its largely nationalistic, lower-income voters in small towns and urban neighborhoods.

On religion and state, Likud has a moderate stance, and supports the preservation of status quo. With time, the party has played into the traditional sympathies of its voter base, though the origins and ideology of Likud are secular. Religious parties have come to view it as a more comfortable coalition partner than Labor.

Likud promotes a revival of Jewish culture, in keeping with the principles of Revisionist Zionism. Likud emphasizes such Israeli nationalist themes as the use of the Israeli flag and the victory in the 1948 Arab–Israeli War. In July 2018, Likud lawmakers backed controversial Nation-State bill into law which declaring Israel as 'nation-state of the Jewish people'.

Likud publicly endorses press freedom and promotion of private sector media, which has grown markedly under governments Likud has led. A Likud government headed by Ariel Sharon, however, closed the popular right-wing pirate radio station Arutz Sheva ("Channel 7"). Arutz Sheva was popular with the Jewish settler movement and often criticised the government from a right-wing perspective.

Historically, the Likud and its pre-1948 predecessor, the Revisionist movement advocated secular nationalism. However, the Likud's first prime minister and long-time leader Menachem Begin, though secular himself, cultivated a warm attitude to Jewish tradition and appreciation for traditionally religious Jews—especially from North Africa and the Middle East. This segment of the Israeli population first brought the Likud to power in 1977. Many Orthodox Israelis find the Likud a more congenial party than any other mainstream party, and in recent years also a large group of Haredim, mostly modern Haredim, joined the party and established the Haredi faction in the Likud.

Composition (1973–1988)

Leaders

Leader election process
During Begin's tenure as leader of Herut/Likud, his leadership was effectively unchallenged. From 1983 through 1992, Herut/Likud elected its party leaders through votes held in party agencies. The 1983 and 1984 Herut leadership elections were undertaken through a vote of Herut's Central Committee. The day after Yitzhak Shamir won the 1983 secret ballot vote of the Herut Central Committee to obtain Herut's party leadership, the party leaders of the other Likud coalition member parties announced that they agreed to have Shamir lead the Likud coalition.

The 1992 Likud leadership election was the first held after Likud became a unified party. The 1992 leadership election was held as a vote of the Likud Central Committee. After 1992, the party moved to electing its leaders through votes of its general membership, with the first such vote taking place in 1993.

Party list selection process 

Prior to the 2006 election, the Likud's Central Committee relinquished control of selecting the Knesset list to the "rank and file" members at Netanyahu's behest. The aim was to improve the party's reputation, as the central committee had gained a reputation for corruption.

Current MKs
Likud currently has 32 Knesset members. They are listed below in the order that they appeared on the party's list for the 2022 elections.

Benjamin Netanyahu
Yariv Levin
Eli Cohen
Yoav Galant
Dudi Amsalem
Amir Ohana
Yoav Kisch
Nir Barkat
Miri Regev
Miki Zohar
Avi Dichter
Israel Katz
Shlomo Karhi
Amichai Chikli
Danny Danon
Idit Silman
David Bitan
Yuli Edelstein
Eliyahu Revivo
Galit Distel-Atbaryan
Nissim Vaturi
Shalom Danino
Haim Katz
Ofir Akunis
Tali Gottlieb
Hanoch Milwidsky
Boaz Bismuth
Moshe Saada
Eli Dellal
Gila Gamliel
Ofir Katz
May Golan

Party organs
Likud Executive
 Director General of the Likud: Zuri Siso
 Deputy DG, head of the Municipal Division, Head of the Computer Division: Zuri Siso
 Manager of the Likud Chairman's Office: Hanni Blaivais
 Director of Foreign Affairs and Likud spokesperson: Eli Hazan

Likud Central Committee
The Central Committee decides on all matters between party conferences, with the exceptions of matters designated to another organ. , the Chairman of the Central Committee is Haim Katz.

The Central Committee has a considerable number of members. For example, in one vote, 3,050 members took part in 2005.

Likud Secretariat
The Secretariat is the body that elects the Director General of the part and the heads  various departments. It defines their powers and supervises their activities.  the Chairman of the Secretariat is Haim Katz.

Likud Court
The Court is the  supreme judicial organ in all matter of the party.

Legal Advisor
The Legal Advisor advises the party and its bodies in the matters of the state law and the Party constitution and represents the party before external authorities. The Legal Advisor has a significant power and may overturn the decisions of most of the party bodies, including the Central Committee.  the Legal Advisor of the Likud Movement is Avi Halevy.

Likud Youth Movement
It is the official body in charge of all young members of Likud. It is a member group of the International Young Democrat Union.

Election results

Knesset

Prime Minister

See also
 List of Likud Knesset Members
 New Likudniks

References

External links

Likud Nederland 
Likud Knesset website

 
Political parties in Israel
Conservatism in Israel
European Conservatives and Reformists
Liberal conservative parties
Political parties established in 1973
Revisionist Zionism
Zionist political parties in Israel
Conservative parties in Israel
National liberal parties
Betar
Liberal parties in Israel
National conservative parties
Right-wing populist parties
1973 establishments in Israel
Right-wing populism in Israel
Right-wing parties
Right-wing politics in Israel
Centre-right parties in Asia